The Kaiman class were high-seas torpedo boats built for the Austro-Hungarian Navy between 1904 and 1910. A total of 24 boats were built by three shipbuilding companies. Yarrow Shipbuilders built the lead ship, Stabilimento Tecnico Triestino of Trieste built 13 boats, and Ganz-Danubius constructed the remaining 10 boats at their shipyards at Fiume. The class was considered to be a successful design, and all boats saw extensive active service during World War I, undertaking a range of tasks, including escort duties, shore bombardments, and minesweeping. All survived, although several were damaged by naval mines and collisions. One was torpedoed and badly damaged by a French submarine, and two sank an Italian submarine. All the boats were transferred to the Allies and scrapped at the end of the war, except for four that were allocated to the navy of the newly created Kingdom of Serbs, Croats and Slovenes. These were discarded and broken up between 1928 and 1930.

Design and construction
After the commissioning of the last of four  torpedo boats for the Austro-Hungarian Navy in 1900, there was a four-year hiatus in Austro-Hungarian construction of destroyers and torpedo boats. In 1904, a prototype of a new torpedo boat was ordered from Yarrow Shipbuilders at Poplar, London, and this became the lead boat of the Kaiman class. The name was in keeping with other reptilian names given to sea-going vessels. Two Austro-Hungarian naval shipbuilders then received plans and engineering assistance from the British and commenced construction; 13 boats were built by Stabilimento Tecnico Triestino, located at Trieste, and the remaining 10 boats by Ganz-Danubius at their shipyards at Fiume. All boats used a single four-cylinder vertical triple expansion engine driving one propeller shaft using steam generated by two coal-fired Yarrow boilers. The crew consisted of 31 officers and enlisted men.

They were armed with four Škoda  L/33 guns and three  torpedo tubes. In 1915, one  machine gun was added. The boats were initially given names, but were redesignated with numbers on 1 January 1914, with three suffixes; E for the Yarrow boat built in England, T for the boats built in Trieste, and F for the boats built in Fiume.

Service history

World War I

1914
At the outbreak of World War I, the Kaiman-class torpedo boats were split between the 1st and 2nd Torpedo Flotillas, based at Cattaro and Pola respectively. In the 1st Torpedo Flotilla, led by the scout cruiser  commanded by Linienschiffskapitän (Captain) Heinrich Seitz, the 3rd Torpedo Division had two groups of Kaiman-class boats: 50 E, 51 T and 73 F made up the 2nd Torpedo Boat Group, and 53 T, 54 T and 56 T made up the 3rd Torpedo Boat Group. In the 2nd Torpedo Flotilla, led by the scout cruiser  commanded by Linienschiffskapitän Benno von Millenkovich, the 5th Torpedo Division had three groups of the class: 55 T, 68 F and 70 F made up the 4th Torpedo Boat Group; 61 T, 65 F and 66 F comprised the 5th Torpedo Boat Group; and 64 F, 69 F and 72 F made up the 6th Torpedo Boat Group. Also in the 2nd Torpedo Flotilla, the 6th Torpedo Division had three more groups of Kaiman-class boats: 52 T, 58 T and 59 T were in the 7th Torpedo Boat Group; 60 T, 62 T and 63 T made up the 8th Torpedo Boat Group; and 57 T, 67 F and 72 F comprised the 9th Torpedo Boat Group. The 1st and 2nd Torpedo Flotillas were supported by the mother ships Gäa and Dampfer IV respectively.

The concept of operation for the Kaiman-class boats was that they would sail in a flotilla at the rear of a cruising battle formation, and were to intervene in fighting only if the battleships around which the formation was established were disabled, or in order to attack damaged enemy battleships. When a torpedo attack was ordered, it was to be led by a scout cruiser, supported by two destroyers to repel any enemy torpedo boats. A group of four to six torpedo boats would deliver the attack under the direction of the flotilla commander.

The Kaiman class was considered to be a very capable design, and all boats saw significant active service during the war. All survived, although several were badly damaged by naval mines and collisions. On 24 July 1914, two days before Austria-Hungary began mobilising, three Kaiman-class boats accompanied Admiral Spaun and three s from Pola to the Bocche di Cattaro, but Admiral Spaun returned on 2 August to avoid being blockaded in the bay by stronger Allied forces. It was intended that a blockade of Antivari and the Montenegrin coast would be maintained by Zenta and Szigetvár, supported by the destroyers and torpedo boats, but when Zenta was sunk by Allied ships on 13 August, the brief blockade effectively ended.

The French submarine  slipped between the protective minefields outside the Bocche di Cattaro and entered the bay on 29 November, but she was spotted by 57 T, commanded by Linienschiffsleutnant Albert Heinz-Erian, who raised the alarm. Cugnot struck an underwater obstacle and cancelled the attack, and 57 T fired a torpedo at her, but the torpedo missed because the depth was set too low. Cugnot then escaped from the bay and out through the minefield gap. On 20 December, the French submarine  posed a serious threat when she entered the harbour at Pola and became tangled in anti-submarine net cables. After four hours of fruitless attempts to free herself, she surfaced and was attacked by 63 T, the Schichau-class torpedo boats Nos. 24 and 39, the Huszár-class destroyer , the older Schichau-built destroyer , some smaller auxiliaries of the 1st Mine Command, and the "Cristo" coastal artillery battery. Curie was sunk by gunfire, but only one crew member was killed and another died of his wounds.

1915

On 14 February 1915, 68 F, the Huszár-class destroyer  and the  SMS 15 bombarded Dulcigno and Antivari on the Montenegrin coastline, and searched for the Montenegrin royal yacht Rumija which was being employed towing lighters with supplies from Medova in Albania to Antivari and into the Bojana estuary. Their shelling of the harbour was disrupted by fire from coastal batteries, and the ships withdrew after laying some mines in the harbour and shelling Cape Crni. On 24 February, the French destroyer  was escorting two steam ships into Antivari harbour when she struck one of the mines laid on 14 February. Dague broke up and sank with half her crew.

The destroyers covered the torpedo boats from outside the harbour while the torpedo boats entered. 67 F destroyed the old long wooden pier with a torpedo and 66 F laid mines near the new pier. Rumija was captured and a prize crew was put aboard, but a strong gale prevented 57 T from taking her in tow, so instead she sank Rumija with a torpedo. This attack was a severe blow for the Montenegrins, as they lost the only ship they could use to tow smaller sailing vessels and lighters, and the destruction of the old longer pier meant that the unloading of larger steam ships was no longer possible. Three days later, 57 T returned to bombard Antivari. The constant Austro-Hungarian attacks, combined with the expectation that Italy would soon enter the war on the Allied side, meant that the French abandoned their efforts to supply Antivari by sea.

As expected, Italy declared war on Austria-Hungary on the afternoon of 23 May, and almost the entire Austro-Hungarian fleet left Pola soon after to deliver an immediate response against Italian cities and towns along the Adriatic coast, aiming to interdict land and sea transport between southern Italy and the northern regions of that country which were expected to be a theatre of land operations. The fleet split into six groups with a range of targets up and down the coast. Group A included three dreadnought battleships, six pre-dreadnought battleships, and four destroyers, accompanied by 50 E, 51 T, 53 T – 54 T, 57 T – 58 T, 60 T, 62 T – 63 T, 67 F–70 F, and 72 F, four s and six seaplanes, and participated in the Bombardment of Ancona, a shore bombardment operation against the northern Adriatic coast of Italy. The bombardment began at 04:04 on 24 May, and caused significant damage in the shipyard, killing 68, 30 of them military personnel, and wounding 150. The destroyers entered the harbour and launched several torpedoes, sinking one steam ship and damaging two others. Group A withdrew after 05:00 when news was received of Italian submarines leaving Venice en route to Pola. Group C, consisting of the pre-dreadnought  escorted by 56 T and 73 F, bombarded Potenza Picena, Termoli and Campomarino, damaging some bridges.

On 18 June, the armoured cruiser  conducted a bombardment of a bridge near Rimini, accompanied by 57 T, 58 T, 63 T and 67 F. On the same day, Szigetvár, 64 F and 69 F bombarded Colonnella, sinking one freighter during the shelling, and sinking two motor schooners encountered off Rimini following the bombardment. The Italian submarine  and 65 T engaged in a torpedo duel outside the entrance to Cattero Bay on 17 August, but neither vessel was damaged. On 9 September 1915, 51 T was torpedoed and had her bow blown off by the  while she was returning with the rest of the 1st Torpedo Flotilla from an operation which confirmed that the Italians had abandoned the mid-Adriatic island of Pelagosa. She was towed to port and repaired.

On the night of 4/5 December, Novara, escorted by three destroyers, 61 T, 66 F and 67 F, left Cattaro Bay to attack Medova. During the raid, several merchant ships and a French submarine were destroyed. A seaplane attack on Ancona on 9 December was supported by 57T and 58T, accompanying the protected cruiser , two destroyers and three 250t-class torpedo boats. Another seaplane attack, this time on Rimini on 14 December, was supported by 68 F and 69 F, along with Szigetvár, two destroyers and three 250t-class torpedo boats.

1916
On New Year's Day 1916, the Austro-Hungarians began preparations for an assault on the Lovćen mountain rangelocated in the hinterland south of the Bocchesupported by both land and naval bombardments. A week later, 52 T, 65 F, 67 F and 73 F accompanied the protected cruiser  in a bombardment of Montenegrin troop positions in the mountains. On 22 February, 70 F and three 250t-class torpedo boats laid a minefield outside Antivari harbour.
        
On 9 July 1916, Novara, 54 T, 73 F and another torpedo boat raided the Otranto Barrage, the Allied naval blockade of the Strait of Otranto, which resulted in the sinking of two drifters, and damage to two more. Five days later, the Italian submarine Balilla was spotted by the observation post on the island of Lissa, and 65 F and 66 F responded to the report. The torpedo boats initially attacked using paravanes, but 65 F was damaged by hers while steaming backwards. Balilla and 65 F then exchanged torpedoes, but both missed. The torpedo boats also engaged Balilla with their deck guns. Damaged, Balilla dived and surfaced twice, probably uncontrolled, then sank. The damaged 65 F was towed to Pola for repairs, and the loss of Balilla resulted in the Italians withdrawing submarine patrols closer to the Otranto Barrage. On 1 August, a large Italian air raid on Fiume was intercepted by Austro-Hungarian aircraft, including one flown by the flying ace Gottfried Freiherr von Banfield, and he drove off three bombers and forced another down. The downed aircraft was towed to Pola by 69 F. On 7 October, 68 F was transporting supplies to the seaplane station at Durazzo when she encountered four s, with another four apparently also in the area. The crew of the torpedo boat jettisoned the supplies and aircraft bombs and evaded the Italian ships.

1917–1918
At the beginning of 1917, the 2nd Torpedo Flotilla, consisting of Admiral Spaun, Huszár-class destroyers and the Kaiman-class torpedo boats, was based out of Pola. On 21 May 1917, the suffix of all Austro-Hungarian torpedo boats was removed, and thereafter they were referred to only by the numeral. On 16 November 1917, 61 and 65 were part of a minesweeping force supporting the bombardment of a  Italian shore battery at Cortellazzo near the mouth of the Piave. All boats were due to have their aft torpedo tube replaced by a single Škoda  L/30 anti-aircraft gun in late 1918, but it is not clear whether this actually occurred. 52 ran aground near Split in December 1918.

Interwar period and World War II
Following World War I, the Kaiman-class boats were allocated to Great Britain, Italy and the new Kingdom of Serbs, Croats and Slovenes, which was later renamed Yugoslavia. Great Britain and Italy scrapped their boats, but the Yugoslavs retained 54, 60, 61 and 69 as T12, T9, T10 and T11 respectively. All four were discarded and broken up between 1928 and 1930.

See also
 List of ships of the Royal Yugoslav Navy

Notes

Footnotes

References

 
 
 
 

 
 
 
 
 

Ships built in Trieste
Torpedo boats of the Royal Yugoslav Navy
World War I torpedo boats of Austria-Hungary
Ships built in Fiume